Schneider's surprise (Tiradelphe schneideri) is a species of nymphalid butterfly in the Danainae subfamily. It is monotypic within the genus Tiradelphe. It is endemic to the Solomon Islands.

References

Danaini
Insects of the Solomon Islands
Butterflies described in 1984
Endemic fauna of the Solomon Islands
Taxonomy articles created by Polbot